Gozal (literally: "beautiful") may refer to:

Places
 Gozal Abdal, village in Ali Sadr Rural District
 Gozal Darreh, village in Kuhpayeh Rural District, Nowbaran District, Saveh County, Markazi Province, Iran

People
 Jootje Gozal (1936–2020), Indonesian sprinter
 Yehiel Gozal (born 1957), former Israeli brigadier
 Gozal Ainitdinova (born 1998), Kazakhstani tennis player
 Gozal Bayramli (1962–2020), Azerbaijani human rights activist

Indonesian-language surnames
Hebrew-language surnames
Turkic unisex given names